This table displays the top-rated primetime television series of the 1960–61 season as measured by Nielsen Media Research.

References

1960 in American television
1961 in American television
1960-related lists
1961-related lists
Lists of American television series